Qargheh or Qarga is a town to the west of Afghanistan's capital city Kabul. The Qargha Reservoir and the former Camp Qargha of the larger National Military Academy of Afghanistan are there.

See also 
Kabul Province

References

Populated places in Kabul Province